We Got It 4 Cheap is a series of mixtapes released by Virginia hip hop duo Clipse and Philadelphia-based rappers Ab-Liva and Sandman, collectively known as the Re-Up Gang. The series produced 3 mixtapes, entitled as volumes. Volume 1 and 2 was released in 2004 and 2005 respectively, and was hosted by DJ Clinton Sparks. Volume 3 was released in 2008, and was hosted by DJ Drama. The main theme of all three mixtapes is drug trafficking, which has always been a Clipse and Re-Up Gang trademark. A compilation album, Re-Up Gang the Saga Continues was released on April 22, 2008. The album consisted of 13 best tracks from the previously released mixtapes, all remixed and remastered.

We Got It 4 Cheap, Volume 1

We Got It 4 Cheap Volume 1 was released in early 2004, and is the first official collection of new material from Clipse since the release of their debut album Lord Willin' in 2002. It is hosted by DJ Clinton Sparks, who helped put the mixtape together, at Pusha T's request. While focused primarily on Clipse, the mixtape also introduced Ab-Liva and Sandman, the other half of their group, the Re-Up Gang. They are both heavily featured throughout its twenty-five tracks, along with Pharrell Williams.

The tape received generally positive reviews from music critics.

Track listing

We Got It 4 Cheap, Volume 2

We Got It 4 Cheap, Volume 2 is the second installment in the We Got It 4 Cheap series. It was released in 2005 as a free internet download and is hosted by DJ Clinton Sparks. It consists of 18 tracks, and heavily features Pharrell Williams and the Re-Up Gang.

The mixtape received widespread critical acclaim from music critics. It holds a score of 88 out of 100 on Album of the Year, based on a single review. Stylus Magazine gave it score of B+, stating "Volume 1 (which overall is still quite good) only seem worse because Vol. 2 is nearly flawless. On 2, the Re-Up Gang reimagines some of the most well-known hits of the first half of 2005, as well as other classics". Pitchfork awarded the tape an 8.8, noting "Volume 2 is the best example of what a mixtape can be". Online blog site RapReviews rated the album to be an 8.5 with editor Tom Doggett saying "Here, the Clipse is immeasurably skilled, rocking every beat imaginable, old-school and new, and doing it with style and substance to spare. The details sear into my skull, from their clothing style to their dealing strategies to the ambitions they have".

Volume 2 is considered to be the best in the series as well as one of the greatest mixtapes of all time. The tape is credited with revolutionizing the mixtape business, allowing to put out quality music despite being free. We Got It 4 Cheap, along with Lil Wayne's Dedication series is said to have influenced the rise of acclaimed online mixtapes. Pitchfork placed the album at number 130 in their list of Top 200 Albums of the 2000s, and at number 2 on their list of the top 50 rap mixtapes of the millennium.

Track listing

We Got It for Cheap Volume 3

We Got It for Cheap Volume 3 was released as a free download through the Re-Up Records website on February 5, 2008. Unlike the previous installments in the series, it is hosted by DJ Drama.

Track listing

Note:
1 Originally appeared on DJ Drama's debut album, Gangsta Grillz: The Album.

References

Clipse albums
Albums produced by the Neptunes
2004 mixtape albums
2005 mixtape albums
2008 mixtape albums
Concept album series